Sir James Raymond Eadie, KC (born March 1962) is a British barrister. Since January 2009, he has served as the First Treasury Counsel (Common Law) or "Treasury Devil", the government's independent barrister on legal issues of national importance. He represented the UK Government in the R (Miller and Dos Santos) v Secretary of State for Exiting the European Union case in 2016, and in the R (Miller) v The Prime Minister case in 2019.

Eadie was born in March 1962 in Kensington, London, England. He attended Radley College and Magdalene College, Cambridge. He was called to the bar at Middle Temple in 1984 and took silk in 2008. He was appointed knight bachelor in the 2018 Birthday Honours List. In September 2019, he represented the British government in the Supreme Court case to determine the legality of Boris Johnson's prorogation.

In 2020, he successfully represented the Home Secretary in the Supreme Court case of Begum v Home Secretary, to do with Shamima Begum.

References

1962 births
Living people
People educated at Radley College
Alumni of Magdalene College, Cambridge
Members of the Middle Temple
English King's Counsel
Lawyers awarded knighthoods
Knights Bachelor
21st-century King's Counsel